The FBI franchise (also called The FBIs) is an American media franchise composed of three television series that are currently broadcast on CBS. It began with the premiere of FBI in 2018 and has since been expanded with spin-offs FBI: Most Wanted and FBI: International. Dick Wolf created FBI with Craig Turk and FBI: International with  Derek Haas, while FBI: Most Wanted was created by René Balcer. All three series are produced by Wolf Entertainment and deal with different aspects of the Federal Bureau of Investigation (FBI).

Multiple characters have appeared in more than one series of the franchise through occasional crossover appearances and the franchise has also had two crossover events. The franchise is also connected to NBC and Wolf Entertainment's Chicago franchise, and as a result the Law & Order franchise, through an appearance by Tracy Spiridakos in FBI, as her character from Chicago P.D.

Series

FBI

The first series in the FBI Franchise focuses on the inner workings of the New York office criminal division of the Federal Bureau of Investigation (FBI). This elite unit brings to bear all their talents, intellect, and technical expertise on major cases in order to keep New York and the country safe.

FBI: Most Wanted

Most Wanted centers on the work of the FBI's Fugitive Task Force, a small and unique team designed to track and capture notorious fugitives on the Bureau's Most Wanted List. The series is more about profiling and analyzing fugitives in order to catch them unlike FBI and FBI: International which are more about the crime and the investigation.

FBI: International

International follows the elite operatives in the FBI's International Fly Team which is headquartered in Budapest. They are charged with locating and neutralizing threats against American interests, wherever they may be.

Series overview

Main Cast

Crossovers

External links

 FBI - CBS's official website
 FBI - Wolf Entertainment site
 FBI: Most Wanted - CBS's official Website
 FBI: Most Wanted - Wolf Entertainment site
 FBI: International - CBS's official website
 FBI: International - Wolf Entertainment site

Notes

References 

FBI (franchise)
Television series created by Dick Wolf
Television franchises
 American police procedural television series